Swabhimani Paksha is a political party in Maharashtra, India, formed by Raju Shetti, as a political wing of the Swabhimani Shetkari Saghtana after its split from the Shetkari Sanghatana led by Sharad Joshi in 2004. In 2004, Raju Shetti was elected to the Maharashtra Vidhan Sabha from Shirol constituency as a Swabhimani Paksha candidate. Later, he was elected to the 15th Lok Sabha in 2009 from Hatkanangle constituency. In 2019, Devendra Mahadevrao Bhuyar was elected to the Maharashtra Vidhan Sabha from Morshi constituency as a Swabhimani Paksha candidate.

The party joined the Bharatiya Janata Party led National Democratic Alliance in 2014 and won one seat in the 2014 Indian general election when Shetti was elected.

Strength in Vidhan Sabha

Split in Organisation

Notes

External links
Swabhimani Shetkari Sanghatana website

1994 establishments in Maharashtra
Conservative liberal parties
Conservative parties in India
Liberal parties in India
Member parties of the United Progressive Alliance
Political parties established in 1994
Political parties in Maharashtra